Matias Hänninen (born 15 March 1991) is a Finnish professional footballer who plays for HIFK, as a midfielder.

Career
Hänninen has played for HIFK, Kiffen and Gnistan .

References

1991 births
Living people
Finnish footballers
HIFK Fotboll players
FC Kiffen 08 players
IF Gnistan players
Kakkonen players
Ykkönen players
Veikkausliiga players
Association football midfielders